The 1978 Spanish Grand Prix was a Formula One motor race held on 4 June 1978 at Jarama. It was the seventh race of the 1978 World Championship of F1 Drivers and the 1978 International Cup for F1 Constructors. The 75-lap race was won from pole position by Mario Andretti, driving a Lotus-Ford, with teammate Ronnie Peterson second and Jacques Laffite third in a Ligier-Matra.

Report

Once again the new Lotus 79 demonstrated its speed, with Mario Andretti on pole and Ronnie Peterson alongside him on the front row, the Swede driving the 79 for the first time. Carlos Reutemann was third in his Ferrari, with James Hunt fourth in his McLaren.

On race day, Hunt made a fast start to lead into the first corner from Andretti and Reutemann, with Peterson dropping to ninth. Andretti re-passed Hunt on lap 6 and then started to pull away. Reutemann ran third until he had to pit for tyres, and so John Watson inherited third until he was passed by Jacques Laffite, but soon the recovering Peterson passed both of them. Hunt now suffered from tyre problems and he also began to drop back, and so Peterson moved into second with Laffite third. This was how it stayed to the end, Andretti winning from Peterson in another Lotus 1–2, and Laffite taking the final spot on the podium. Reutemann had a huge accident on lap 58 when his Ferrari flew 8 feet in the air, cleared the barrier and landed in the debris fencing.

Classification

Pre-qualifying

*Positions in red indicate entries that failed to pre-qualify.

Qualifying

*Positions in red indicate entries that failed to qualify.

Race

Championship standings after the race

Drivers' Championship standings

Constructors' Championship standings

References

Spanish Grand Prix
Spanish Grand Prix
Grand Prix
Spanish Grand Prix